The prime minister of Estonia (Estonian: peaminister) is the head of government of the Republic of Estonia. The prime minister is nominated by the president after appropriate consultations with the parliamentary factions and confirmed by the parliament (Riigikogu). In case of disagreement, the Parliament can reject the president's nomination and choose their own candidate. In practice, since the prime minister must maintain the confidence of Parliament in order to remain in office, they are usually the leader of the senior partner in the governing coalition. The current prime minister is Kaja Kallas of the Reform Party. She took the office on 26 January 2021 following the resignation of Jüri Ratas.

In one's role as appointed by the president, the prime minister does not head any specific ministry. Rather, in accordance with the constitution, the prime minister supervises the work of the government. The prime minister's significance and role in the government, and his or her relations with other ministries often depend on the position of the party led by the prime minister vis-à-vis the coalition partners, and on how much influence the prime minister possesses within one's own party. If the prime minister has a strong position within one's party, and the government is made up solely of representatives of that party, the prime minister can enjoy considerable authority. In all crucial national questions, however, the final word rests with the parliament as the legislative power.

Unlike counterparts in other parliamentary republics, the prime minister is both de jure and de facto chief executive. This is because the Constitution explicitly vests executive power in the Government, of which the prime minister is the leader. In most other parliamentary republics, the president is at least nominal chief executive, while bound by convention to act on the cabinet's advice.

History
After Estonia declared independence from then-the warring Russian and German Empires in 1918, the Provisional Government of Estonia was led by a Prime Minister until 1920. The 1920 Constitution set up a head of government whose position called the State Elder (riigivanem) and there was no separate head of state. This system was a radically parliamentary system because the State Elder could be dismissed by the Riigikogu with a simple majority. Moreover, the State Elder was not the Commander-in-Chief of the Armed Forces, nor could they ratify laws or dissolve the Riigikogu. The dissolution of Parliament was only possible through a referendum. Under the 1934 Constitution passed by plebiscite, the position of Prime Minister was recreated as head of government in a more presidential system. Under this constitution, the head of state took the name State Elder (riigivanem) identical to the name for the 1920–1934 head of government. The newly established head of state could appoint and dismiss the Prime Minister and Cabinet, veto laws, give decrees (statutes) and dissolve the Riigikogu. The incumbent Prime Minister in duties of the State Elder of Estonia Konstantin Päts, staged a self-coup to counter the threat of the Vaps Movement and suspended the full implementation of the 1934 Constitution, not going ahead with elections for the new head of state and disbanding the Riigikogu. Päts remained the Prime Minister in duties of the State Elder 1934–1937, and as President-regent (riigihoidja) for 1937–1938. According to the 1938 Constitution, the position of the Prime Minister was retained, while the head of state was finally renamed the President under a presidential system. The 1992 Constitution after the Soviet occupation reinstated the 1938–1940 positions of Prime Minister and President under a parliamentary system.

1918–1920

1934–1937

1938–1944

1990–present

See also
List of heads of government of Estonia
List of heads of government-in-exile
President of Estonia

Notes

References 

Estonia, Prime Minister
Prime Ministers
1918 establishments in Estonia
1938 establishments in Estonia
1990 establishments in Estonia